The 1990 SeaWorld Holiday Bowl was a post-season college football bowl game between the Texas A&M Aggies and BYU Cougars on December 29, 1990, at Jack Murphy Stadium, now known as Qualcomm Stadium, in San Diego. The game was part of the 1990 NCAA Division I-A football season and was the final game of the season for both teams. Texas A&M defeated BYU 65–14.

The game featured BYU's Heisman Trophy winner Ty Detmer, and marked the last time for more than 20 years that the season's Heisman winner would appear in a bowl before New Year's Day. This would not happen again until the 2011 Alamo Bowl, featuring Baylor's Robert Griffin III.

Game summary
Texas A&M - R. Wilson 1 yard touchdown yard run (Talbot kick)
BYU - C. Smith 8 yard touchdown yard pass from Detmer (Kauffman kick)
Texas A&M - D. Lewis 6 yard touchdown yard run (Talbot kick)
Texas A&M - Richardson 6 yard touchdown yard run (Talbot kick)
Texas A&M - Safety
Texas A&M - Richardson 22 yard touchdown pass from D. Lewis (Talbot kick)
Texas A&M - Garrett 6 yard touchdown pass from Richardson (Talbot kick)
BYU - Clark 1 yard touchdown pass from Evans (Kauffman kick)
Texas A&M - Richardson 27 yard touchdown yard run (Talbot kick)
Texas A&M - D. Lewis 3 yard touchdown yard run (Talbot kick)
Texas A&M - Paterson 14 yard touchdown yard pass from Pavlas (Talbot kick)
Texas A&M - Krahl 9 yard touchdown yard pass from Pavlas (Talbot kick)

Texas A&M dominated the Cougars, rushing for 356 yards (while BYU had -12), passing for 324 (while BYU had 197), and forcing four turnovers (with the Aggies only having one), while only punting once and having the ball 38:28 of the game, with 72 return yards. BYU had 207 return yards (in part due to having 10 kickoffs and one punt to return), but they also had 10 penalties for 204 yards (while A&M had just 3 for 59 yards), with a paltry 21:31 possession time. Ty Detemer went 11-of-23 for 120 yards and one touchdown and interception while being sacked twice. He was later replaced by Joe Evans, who went 4-of-9 for 77 yards with one touchdown, while being sacked thrice. Bucky Richardson threw 9-of-11 for 203 yards with one touchdown, while also rushing for 129 yards on 12 carries and 2 touchdowns, along a catch for 22 yards that also was for a touchdown. His four touchdown performance gained him MVP honors. William Thomas had 6 tackles, 2 of them going for sacks while being named defensive MVP.

References

Holiday Bowl
Holiday Bowl
Texas A&M Aggies football bowl games
BYU Cougars football bowl games
1990 in sports in California